The 2015 Summit League women's soccer tournament was the postseason women's soccer tournament for the Summit League held on November 5 and 7, 2015. The three-match tournament took place at Fishback Soccer Park in Brookings, South Dakota. The four-team single-elimination tournament consisted of two rounds based on seeding from regular season conference play. The South Dakota State Jackrabbits were the defending champions, and were successful in defending their championship. They defeated North Dakota State in the final. The win was South Dakota State's third as a member of the conference, and third for coach Lang Wedemeyer. This was South Dakota State's second consecutive championship.

Seeding
The top four of the ten teams competing during the regular season qualified for the 2015 tournament. Seeding was based on regular season conference records. No tiebreakers were needed.

Bracket
Source:

Schedule

Semifinals

Final

All-Tournament Team

Source:

MVP in bold

References

2015 in American soccer
Summit League soccer
Women's college association football